Sulphur Springs Draw is a river in Texas. It is a dry branch or arroyo and one of the sub-tributaries of Beals Creek. It passes through Lamesa, Texas and joins Beals Creek at Big Spring, Texas.

See also
List of rivers of Texas

References

USGS Geographic Names Information Service
USGS Hydrologic Unit Map – State of Texas (1974)

Rivers of Texas